The 2017 Tyrepower Tasmania SuperSprint was a motor racing event for the Supercars Championship, held on the weekend of 7 to 9 April 2017. The event was held at Symmons Plains Raceway in Launceston, Tasmania, and was scheduled to consist of one race of 120 kilometres and one race of 200 kilometres in length. It was the second event of fourteen in the 2017 Supercars Championship and hosted Races 3 and 4 of the season. The event was the 45th running of the Tasmania SuperSprint.

Report

Background 

Shane van Gisbergen entered the event as the championship leader ahead of Fabian Coulthard and James Courtney.

Race 3
Race three began in damp conditions. Polesitter Scott McLaughlin had a slow getaway from pole position and was rounded up by Chaz Mostert and Shane van Gisbergen off the start. On lap two, Fabian Coulthard made contact with Rick Kelly on the exit of turn three, slowing up Garth Tander (who was behind Kelly), who in turn was hit by Cameron Waters and subsequently spun, causing a chain reaction crash involving Tim Blanchard, James Courtney, Will Davison, Simona de Silvestro, Taz Douglas, James Moffat, Nick Percat, Scott Pye, Alex Rullo and Tim Slade. The race was immediately red-flagged and of the cars involved only Coulthard, de Silvestro and Waters returned to the grid (Coulthard and Waters) or the pit-lane (de Silvestro). The race was suspended for 45 minutes before the field completed two more laps under the Safety Car before the race was declared under time-certain conditions, with van Gisbergen winning the race after passing Mostert before the incident occurred. McLaughlin finished down in 14th having accidentally driven into the pit-lane as opposed to the grid in the red-flag period. Points were initially awarded to the fifteen classified finishers but were later rescinded.

Results

Race 3

Qualifying

Race 

 As the completed race distance was less than 75% of its original designation, no points were awarded.

Race 4

Qualifying

Race

References 

Tyrepower Tasmania SuperSprint
Motorsport in Tasmania
Tyrepower Tasmania SuperSprint